Ateyah Al-Shaari ( 2018) is or was a Libyan rebel leader of the Shura Council of Mujahideen in Derna, which he dissolved into the Derna Protection Force on 11 May 2018, during the Libyan National Army's offensive on Derna. On 26 June, Agenzia Nova reported that Ateyah had been killed in a shootout with LNA forces the preceding day, but Libyan National Army spokesman Ahmed al-Mismari was unable to confirm this.

References 

Leaders of Islamic terror groups
Libyan rebels
Libyan Islamists